GameStorm is a fan-run not-for-profit annual gaming convention held in the spring in the Portland, Oregon metro area.

History
GameStorm started in 1998 as a fan-run event at the Clackamas, Oregon Denney's Convention Center.  The GameStorm group often provides gaming programming at OryCon and other conventions in the Pacific Northwest as well, and has an extensive game library.  GameStorm also hosts panel discussions about games and gaming-related topics, provides space for designers to play-test new products, and cross-promotes for other area conventions.

GameStorm provides a number of different activities for gaming fandom:

Panel discussion topics, often with gaming industry professionals
Role-playing games (RPG)
Live action role-playing games (LARP)
Miniature figure (gaming)
Collectible card games (CGG)
Board games
Video console gaming

GameStorm, like OryCon, is run entirely by fans, with no paid staff, and is sponsored by Oregon Science Fiction Conventions, Inc. (OSFCI), a 501(c)3 not-for-profit corporation.

Upcoming GameStorm Convention
GameStorm 23 will be March 23-26, at the Red Lion Jantzen Beach.

Past Guests of Honor
 Peter Adkison
 Vincent Baker
 Matt Branstad
 Jason Bulmahn
 Andy Collins
 Monte Cook
 David Coronado
 James Ernest
 Richard Garfield
 Andrew Hackard
 Rob Heinsoo
 Reiner Knizia
 Robin Laws
 Tom Lehmann
 Steve Long
 Rick Loomis
 Andy and Kristen Looney
 Michelle McNeill
 Sam Mitschke
 Mike Mulvihill
 Brian Poel
 Michael Stackpole
 Lisa Steenson
 Jay Tummelson

External links
GameStorm.org website

Gaming conventions
Fan conventions
Conventions in Oregon